Judith Herczig (born 11 April 1976) is an Austrian table tennis player. She competed in the women's doubles event at the 2000 Summer Olympics.

References

1976 births
Living people
Austrian female table tennis players
Olympic table tennis players of Austria
Table tennis players at the 2000 Summer Olympics
Table tennis players from Budapest